The Rev. John W. Cavanaugh, C.S.C. (May 21, 1870 – May 22, 1935) was an American priest and President of the University of Notre Dame from 1905 to 1919.

He came to Notre Dame at the age of 16, in 1886. On August 15, 1889, John Cavanaugh received the habit and worked during his Novitiate for Notre Dame English professor Maurice Francis Egan. He received his Litt. B. in 1890. On August 15, 1891, Cavanaugh made his final vows. From 1892 to 1905 he helped Fr. Hudson with The Ave Maria. On April 20, 1894, Cavanaugh was ordained a priest by bishop Joseph Rademacher of Fort Wayne. He was superior of Holy Cross Seminary from 1898 to 1905.

President of the University of Notre Dame
Cavanaugh was an intellectual figure, known for his literary gifts and his eloquent speeches. During his presidency, he dedicated himself to improve Notre Dame's academic and scholastic reputation, and the number of students awarded bachelor's and master's degrees significantly increased during his tenure. As part of his ongoing commitment to improve the university's academic standing, Cavanaugh attracted a number of eminent scholars to the University, established a chair in journalism, and introduced courses in Chemical Engineering. During his time as president, Notre Dame also rapidly became a significant force on the football field. Yet Cavanaugh resented the implications that Notre Dame should be known as a football school, and almost ended the football program because it was a money-losing endeavor until 1913. Ironically, two of Notre Dame's most famous football personalities appeared during his tenure, George Gipp and Knute Rockne. Cavanaugh Hall at the University of Notre Dame was dedicated in 1936 in his honor.

References

External sources

Presidents of the University of Notre Dame
20th-century American Roman Catholic priests
Congregation of Holy Cross
1870 births
1935 deaths